The qualifying rounds for the 2008–09 UEFA Champions League began on 15 July 2008. In total, there were three qualifying rounds which provided 16 clubs to join the group stages.

Teams

First qualifying round
The draw for the first qualifying round took place on 1 July 2008 in Nyon, Switzerland.

Seeding

Summary

|}

Matches

Dinamo Zagreb won 3–1 on aggregate.

Artmedia Petržalka won 3–0 on aggregate.

Dinamo Tbilisi won 3–1 on aggregate.

FBK Kaunas won 7–2 on aggregate.

Göteborg won 9–0 on aggregate.

Ventspils won 4–1 on aggregate.

Anorthosis won 3–0 on aggregate.

1–1 on aggregate; Inter Baku won on away goals.

Tampere United won 3–2 on aggregate.

Domžale won 3–0 on aggregate.

Modriča won 4–1 on aggregate.

Sheriff won 4–1 on aggregate.

Drogheda United won 3–1 on aggregate.

BATE won 3–0 on aggregate.

Second qualifying round
The draw for the second qualifying round took place on 1 July 2008 in Nyon, Switzerland.

Seeding

Notes

Summary

|}

First leg

FBK Kaunas won 2–1 on aggregate.

2–2 on aggregate; Brann won on away goals.

Partizan won 3–1 on aggregate.

Artmedia Petržalka won 7–3 on aggregate.

Anorthosis won 4–3 on aggregate.

Dinamo Zagreb won 6–2 on aggregate.

Panathinaikos won 3–0 on aggregate.

Basel won 5–3 on aggregate.

Sparta Prague won 3–0 on aggregate.

Dynamo Kyiv won 4–3 on aggregate.

BATE won 4–3 on aggregate.

Wisła Kraków won 6–2 on aggregate.

Fenerbahçe won 7–0 on aggregate.

Aalborg BK won 7–1 on aggregate.

Third qualifying round
The draw for the third qualifying round round took place on 1 August 2008 in Nyon, Switzerland.

Seeding

Notes

Summary

|}

Matches

Anorthosis won 3–1 on aggregate.

Basel won 2–1 on aggregate.

Shakhtar Donetsk won 5–1 on aggregate.

Atlético Madrid won 4–1 on aggregate.

Aalborg BK won 4–0 on aggregate.

Barcelona won 4–1 on aggregate.

BATE won 2–1 on aggregate.

Liverpool won 1–0 on aggregate.

Fenerbahçe won 4–3 on aggregate.

Arsenal won 6–0 on aggregate.

Dynamo Kyiv won 8–2 on aggregate.

Juventus won 5–1 on aggregate.

Marseille won 3–1 on aggregate.

Fiorentina won 2–0 on aggregate.

Steaua București won 3–2 on aggregate.

Panathinaikos won 3–1 on aggregate.

Notes

External links
Qualifying Rounds Information

Qualifying Rounds
2008-09